Mabibo is an administrative ward in the Ubungo District of the Dar es Salaam Region of Tanzania. According to the 2002 census, the ward has a total population of 73,978.

References

Kinondoni District
Wards of Dar es Salaam Region